Alfred Brian Siddall (2 May 1930 – 2007) was an English footballer who played in the Football League for Bournemouth, Ipswich Town and Stoke City.

Career
Siddall started his career at his local club Witton Albion before he earned a contract at Wolverhampton Wanderers however injury prevented him making an appearance. He rejoined Witton Albion and was signed by Northwich Victoria soon after. In 1950 Siddall joined Football League side Stoke City and was to challenge John Malkin for a place on the right wing and he had a successful 1951–52 and 1952–53 season when he played in virtually half the league games in both seasons before he moved to Bournemouth and on to Ipswich Town. He finished playing football at Haverhill Rovers while also working at Felixstowe Docks.

Career statistics
Source:

References

External links
 

English footballers
Witton Albion F.C. players
Wolverhampton Wanderers F.C. players
Northwich Victoria F.C. players
Stoke City F.C. players
AFC Bournemouth players
Ipswich Town F.C. players
Haverhill Rovers F.C. players
English Football League players
1930 births
2007 deaths
Sportspeople from Northwich
Association football wingers